Chandi Charitar Ukti Bilas or Chandi Charitar Ukat(i) Bilas (pronunciation: , also called Chandi Charitar 1 (ਚੰਡੀ ਚਰਿਤ੍ਰ (ਭਾਗ ੧)) or Chandi Charitar Part One is a heroic poetic composition, included in the 4th chapter of Dasam Granth, whose authorship is generally and traditionally attributed to Guru Gobind Singh.

Though it is based on Markandeya Purana, the direction and narration of whole story is totally independent of Markandeya Purana.

Overview 
Chandi stands for the embodiment of ferocious "shakti" or the female form of cosmic energy. Bilas comes from vilaas which can also be described as chronicles/descriptive/heroics, Ukati means on, and Charitar means characteristics and function. So, Chandi Charitar Ukti Bilas means "Discussion on characteristics and functions of Chandi".

Ukat(i) bilas is divided into eight cantos, comprises 233 couplets and quatrains, employing seven different metres, with Savaiyya and Dohara predominating. In the former, the source of the story mentioned is Durga Saptasati, which is a portion of Markandeya Purana, from chapters 81 to 94.

The language of the composition is Braj. Ukti Bilas was composed at Anandpur Sahib, before 1698, the year when the Bichitra Natak was completed. The concluding lines of the last canto of Chandi Charitra Ukti Bilas as included in the Dasam Granth manuscript preserved at Patna, however, mention 1752 Bk / AD 1695 as the year of the composition of this work.

There are few more related compositions of Guru Gobind Singh i.e. Chandi Charitar 2 (self-composed but it is said to be based on Devi Bhagwat Puran skandh 5, chapters 2 to 35), Chandi di Var (self-composed), Chandi Charitar - Charitropakhyan - Charitar 1) (self-composed) and Ugardanti (self-composed).

Contents 

The bani starts with ੴ ਵਾਹਿਗੁਰੂ ਜੀ ਕੀ ਫਤਹਿ॥ (The Lord is one and the Victory is of the Lord) and ends with ਇਤਿ ਸ੍ਰੀ੍ਰ ਮਾਰਕੰਡੇ ਪੁਰਾਨੇ ਸ੍ਰੀ ਚੰਡੀ ਚਰਿਤ੍ਰੋ ਉਕਤਿ ਬਿਲਾਸ ਦੇਵ ਸੁਰੇਸ ਸਹਿਤ ਜੈਕਾਰ ਸਬਦ ਕਰਾ ਅਸਟਮੋ ਧਿਆਇ ਸਮਾਪਤਮ ਸਤੁ ਸੁਭਮ ਸਤੁ॥੮॥(End of the Eighth Chapter of Chandi CHaritar Ukati Bilas based on Markandeya Puran, All Deities and their King hailed to Chandi) 

In the beginning, the author mentioned attributes of one whom he worshiped:

Definition of Chandi 
First Twelve Lines are about Definition of the word chandi. After this basic explanation Author have explained the Character (Charitar) of Chandi:

Chandi means "the violent and impetuous one". In Gurmat, Chandi is attributed to intuitive and discerning mind called Vivek Budhi which fights with negativity. In contrast, Sakar Hindus and the anti-Dasam Granth people portray Chandi as a lady having physical appearance: a combination of Mahakali, Mahalakshmi and Maha Saraswati.

Deh Siva Var Mohe 

The most popular Hymns in Sikhism is taken from Chandi Charitar Ukati Bilas:

References 
https://www.deutsches-informationszentrum-sikhreligion.de/SriDasamGranth_de.php

Bibliography 

 Sri Dasam Granth Sahib: Questions and Answers: The book on Sri Dasam Granth Sahib

Dasam Granth